The Celyphidae, commonly known as beetle flies or beetle-backed flies, are a family of flies (order Diptera). About 115 species in about 9 genera are known chiefly from the Oriental and Afrotropic biogeographic regions with one lineage in the New World.

Description
Celyphidae are small to medium-sized and easily recognised. The scutellum is enlarged, and forming a protective shell over the abdomen, giving them a beetle-like appearance. Also, like many beetles, Celyphidae are often shiny or metallic in color. The head has few bristles. The wings, when at rest, are folded beneath the scutellar "shell". The arista of the antenna is often flattened and leaf-like at the base. The family name is derived from the Greek word κέλυφος for pod or shell. Male celyphids lack an aedeagus and instead have paired gonapophyses that are used in copulation and are of key taxonomic value.

Biology
The biology of the family is poorly known. Adults are found along streams and rivers, and in wet, grassy areas. Larvae are saprophagous.

Relatives
The family Celyphidae is considered by most authors to be the sister taxon of the Lauxaniidae (e.g., Griffiths 1972), and this has been supported by some molecular studies which suggest the (Chamaemyiidae + (Lauxaniidae + Celyphidae)) within the Lauxanoiodea. In the past they have occasionally been considered a specialized lineage within the Lauxaniidae.

Classification
Genus Acelyphus Malloch, 1929 - Asia
Genus Atopocelyphus, Gaimari, 2017 - French Guiana
Genus Celyphus Dalman, 1818 - Africa and Asia
Subgenus Celyphus Dalman, 1818 - Asia
Subgenus Hemiglobus Frey, 1941 - Africa
Subgenus Paracelyphus Bigot, 1859 - Asia
Genus Chamaecelyphus Frey, 1941 - Africa
Genus Idiocelyphus Malloch, 1929 - Asia
Genus Oocelyphus Chen, 1949 - southern China
Genus Spaniocelyphus Hendel, 1914 - Africa and Asia

References

Further reading
 Keys genera, species.
 Keys genera, species.

Paap, L. Celyphidae in Soós, Á, Paap, L. (Eds.) 1984 - 1992. Catalogue of Palaearctic Diptera 9 . Akadémiai Kiadó, Budapest - Elsevier, Amsterdam: 63-66..

External links

Research project on Celyphidae
Images from Diptera.info
Family Celyphidae at EOL Images from EOL
World list

 
Brachycera families